HD 192886, also known as HR 7749 or rarely 84 G. Telescopii, is a solitary, yellowish-white hued star located in the southern constellation Telescopium. It has an apparent magnitude of 6.13, making it barely visible to the naked eye, even in ideal conditions. At its current distance, HD 192886's brightness is diminished by 0.13 magnitudes due to extinction from interstellar dust. It has an absolute magnitude of +3.69.

HD 192886 has a stellar classification of F5 V, making it an ordinary F-type main-sequence star. However, Richard O. Gray and colleagues give it a class of F6 IV-V, indicating that it is slightly cooler and more evolved. It has 1.32 times the mass of the Sun and 1.39 times the Sun's radius. It has a solar metallicity ([Fe/H] = +0.02) and is estimated to be 2.23 billion years old. HD 192886 is more likely a main sequence star because it is only 0.24 magnitudes above the main sequence.

References

F-type main-sequence stars
High-proper-motion stars
Telescopium (constellation)
CD-47 13340
192886
100184
7749
Telescopii, 84